Emilia McCarthy (born August 28, 1997) is a Canadian actress, dancer and writer. She plays the role of Abby Ackerman on Max & Shred, her first main role in a television series. It is produced by YTV and also aired on Nickelodeon. She played one of Sheriff Sworn's twin daughters, Alyssa Sworn, in the Netflix television series Hemlock Grove. McCarthy also played Taylor Dean in the Disney Channel Original Movie Zapped. In 2018, she portrayed the role of Lacey in the Disney Channel Original Movie Zombies and reprised the role in Zombies 2 and Zombies 3.

In July 2013, she began working on the film Maps to the Stars playing Kayla. The film premiered on April 14, 2014 at various festivals and generated positive reviews.

Early life 
McCarthy was born on August 28, 1997 in London, Ontario, where she was raised. She is the daughter of Margarita De Antuñano, Director of the Canada-Mexico Cultural Exchange Centre and a Spanish teacher and Barry McCarthy a retired Vice-principal. McCarthy has Mexican and Irish ancestry; her mother is Mexican Canadian and father of Irish origin. She is fluent in English, Spanish, and French. McCarthy discovered her passion for acting since she was a child. She is passionate about acting, dancing and modelling and vigorously pursues "her call in life." As her grandmother Beatriz Carrillo has said "Emilia is a born artist who acts and dances,  I think she was born with this gift".

McCarthy took acting classes at Armstrong Acting Studios, in Toronto. She stated in a 2013 interview that:

"I was about seven and literally woke up one day and said, Mom, Dad, I want to be an actress".

Then in 2006 she landed her first role as Elle Fanning's photo double in the film Babel starring Brad Pitt and Cate Blanchett. The movie was directed by Oscar winner, Alejandro Gonzalez Iñarritu.

Career

2007–12: Early career 
At eight years-old, McCarthy had the opportunity to perform with Cate Blanchett and Gael García Bernal as daughter Cate—a role she shared with Elle Fanning—in the Golden Globe-winning film Babel.

With her father's help, McCarthy published a book entitled Baby's Wish when she was only eight years old. The book was inspired by a dream McCarthy had.

In 2007, at the age of nine, McCarthy landed the role of Laura Westover for the TV movie Booky & the Secret Santa. In 2009, at age 11, she was hired again to resume the role of Laura Westover in the movie Booky's Crush being the last film in the series.

McCarthy made a special appearance in the episode "All In" on the CW-Ranked Beauty & the Beast as Cena. The episode was released on October 25, 2012.

McCarthy has performed in several theatre productions like Hairspray and Tarantella Cabaret, also made stage appearances in works such as Aida and Seussical Jr.

2013–present: Movies and Max & Shred 
McCarthy auditioned in Toronto for Eli Roth, director / producer of the series. In April, Netflix premiered the series Hemlock Grove of 13 episodes. Emilia appeared in 9 episodes as Alyssa Sworn in the series.

McCarthy was the star of the web series Unlikely Heroes and Kid's Town in 2013. That same year McCarthy landed the female lead role in the film Bunks, a film original Disney XD. Where Lauren plays a camp counselor, who wants the rules are followed by campers.

McCarthy was part of the main cast of the film Zapped, she plays Taylor Dean, the antagonist of Zendaya's character. The film premiered on June 27, 2014 in the United States and United Kingdom and America premiered on August 10, 2014.

The July 15, 2013 it was confirmed that McCarthy would be part of the cast of the film Maps to the Stars. She played the character of Kayla. Production began in July 2013. EOne introduced the film with his other films in state post-production in 2013 at the Toronto Film Festival. On April 14, 2014, the first preview of the film that was released. The film premiered at the 2014 Cannes Film Festival and the performances of the cast were praised.

McCarthy plays the role of Abby Ackerman in the new YTV series Max & Shred, which also will be transmitted by Nickelodeon. The series had a release date of October 6, 2014 in the United States.

Artistry

Influences 

McCarthy's main influences are Ryan Gosling and Rachel McAdams. In 2014, she said in an interview, "Ryan Gosling and Rachel McAdams are my inspiration. They were also born in London, Ontario. So if they can do it, why not me?". In another interview she stated, "I am a big fan of Rachel McAdams and Ryan Gosling, as they are both from London, Ontario, which is where I was born and raised. Rachel McAdams went to the same drama school as me. Not only that, but both are amazing actors and knowing that they came from the same place I came from, is crazy".

Marketing

Books 
Emilia McCarthy is also a published writer. At the age of eight, along with her father, she published her book  Baby's Wish. There is a copy of the book in the London, Ontario Central Library.

Personal life 
In 2014, McCarthy graduated from Westdale Secondary School. Other notable Westdale alumni include Eugene Levy and Martin Short. In 2015, she began attending Ryerson University (now Toronto Metropolitan University) in parallel with her acting career, majoring in film studies and minoring in psychology.

Filmography

Film

Television

Web

Bibliography 
 Baby's Wish (2006)

Awards and nominations

See also 
 Hemlock Grove

References

External links 
 
 
 

1997 births
Living people
21st-century Canadian actresses
Actresses from London, Ontario
Canadian child actresses
Canadian film actresses
Canadian people of Mexican descent
Canadian people of Irish descent
Canadian television actresses
Writers from London, Ontario